The Medal for Bravery or Courage, commonly known as the Medal of Miloš Obilić, is a state decoration awarded by the Republic of Serbia, and before that by the Kingdom of Serbia and the Kingdom of Yugoslavia, for heroic acts.

History
It was founded on 12 July 1913 by King Peter I and granted to soldiers for acts of great personal courage or for personal courage demonstrated on the battlefield. The medal was awarded in two degrees (Gold and Silver medals). The medal started being awarded during the Second Balkan War, continued during World War I 1914-1918, and during World War II, 1941-1945, to members of the Yugoslav Army and of Allied forces. On the obverse of the coin is the ideal figure of Miloš Obilić, the Serbian medieval knight who sacrificed his own life at the Battle of Kosovo in 1389, by assassinating the Ottoman Sultan Murad I.

The Medal for Bravery was worn on a red bar. The author was Đorđe Jovanović.

In 2009 the Republic of Serbia adopted a law regulating medals and continued to award the Medal for Bravery (2 Classes: Golden and Silver medal) and in 2010 extended its name to include "Miloš Obilić" (the Medal for Bravery "Miloš Obilić").

First version (1912)

Prior to this version, the original medal for bravery in Serbia was established on 14 November 1912. This medal had two degrees (Gold and Silver Medal, which differed in appearance). The Gold medal was worn on a red bar, and a Silver ribbon (red-blue-white mimicking the colors of the flag of Serbia). This medal was used very briefly and was soon superseded by another model. The reason for the replacement was because Serbia was represented by an allegorical female figure on the medal's obverse. According to some historians, the female figure was based on Serbian heroine Milica Stojadinović-Srpkinja. The female figure was considered to be an unfitting motive on the medal for bravery for the Serbian soldier. Serbian officers openly expressed dissatisfaction, after which it was decided to change the model to the one depicting Miloš Obilić.

Notable recipients
In 2012 it was posthumously awarded to Srđan Aleksić, a young Serb killed while defending his Bosniak friend.

See also 
 Obilić Medal
 Medal for Bravery (Yugoslavia)

References

External links
 THE BRAVERY MEDAL (1913), The Official website of the Serbian Monarchy

 
Bravery Medal
Orders, decorations, and medals of Yugoslavia
Courage awards
Awards established in 1913
1913 establishments in Serbia
Orders, decorations, and medals of the Kingdom of Serbia